John Lemoyne Mills (May 8, 1918 – February 11, 2007) was an American professional basketball player. He played in the National Basketball League for the Youngstown Bears and averaged 2.3 points per game.

References

1918 births
2007 deaths
American men's basketball players
United States Navy personnel of World War II
Basketball players from Youngstown, Ohio
Centers (basketball)
Forwards (basketball)
High school basketball coaches in Ohio
Military personnel from Ohio
Mount Union Purple Raiders men's basketball players
Youngstown Bears players